The MIA e Train is one of three automated people mover systems operating at Miami International Airport (along with the Skytrain and the MIA Mover).  The MIA e Train connects the satellite building of Concourse E (which contains gates E20-E33) with the rest of Concourse E (Gates E2-E11) which is connected to the main terminal.  The system opened in 2016 replacing an earlier system and was built at a cost of $87 million.

Operation
The MIA e Train consists of two three-car cable-driven MiniMetro trains developed by Leitner-Poma (unlike the Skytrain and MIA Mover which use Mitsubishi Crystal Mover vehicles).  The two trains run on parallel independent guideways and shuttle back and forth between the two stations.

History
The MIA e Train opened in 2016 and replaced an earlier system that was built in 1980.  The original system, which did not have an official name, was built by the Westinghouse Electric Corporation, whose transportation division is now owned by Bombardier Transportation.  It was Westinghouse's second airport people mover system in Florida, after the Tampa International Airport People Movers.  It operated in a similar fashion to the current system and used six Westinghouse C-100 vehicles in two three-car trains, which were also the same vehicles that originally operated on Downtown Miami's Metromover, which opened in 1986.

By the mid 2000s, the system was showing its age.  On November 28, 2008, the train on the south guideway failed to stop at the main station and crashed into the wall at the end of the line, injuring seven people.  After the crash, the system continued to operate with only the train on the north guideway with the south guideway taken out of service.  When the system was replaced with the MIA e Train, the out-of-service south guideway was converted first with the north train and guideway being converted and replaced once the south train was operational.

See also
List of airport people mover systems

References

Transportation in Miami
Airport people mover systems in the United States
Railway lines opened in 2016
Miami International Airport
2010 establishments in Florida